The 2000 Westar Rules season was the fourth season of ‘Westar Rules’ and the 116th season of the various incarnations of senior football in Perth. It was the last season before the competition's name was changed back to the traditional ‘WAFL’ as it was clear the public had not been attracted by the change. Owing to the Sydney Olympics, Westar Rules shortened the 2000 season from twenty to eighteen matches per club, and retained this eighteen-match season in 2001 and 2002 before going back to the current twenty-match season.

The 2000 season saw East Perth freed from the coaching and ground disputes that had wiped out their 1999 season, aided by a host club arrangement with West Coast and with Leederville Oval as home ground and Tony Micale as coach. The team rose from second last, with only five wins, to top of the table losing only three games. The Royals were to decisively win the 2000, 2001 and 2002 premierships for the first “hat-trick” since Swan Districts between 1982 and 1984, and their only premierships since 1978. Cinderella club Peel Thunder rose off the bottom for the first time, winning twice as many matches as in their first three seasons combined.

Perth were affected by the loss of 1999 standout player Gus Seebeck at only twenty-three to become a member of the Australasian PGA after a brief second stint with South Fremantle, and also lost Leon Davis, Richard Kelly, Chance Bateman, Richard Pang and Russel Thomas. The Demons’ 2000 season was until the last game an unmitigated disaster that saw a twenty-game losing streak. This constitutes Perth's longest run of losses and the equal seventh longest in WAFL history.

Home-and-away season

Round 1

Round 2

Round 3

Round 4 (Easter weekend)

Round 5

Round 6

Round 7

Round 8

Round 9

Round 10 (Foundation Day)

Round 11

Round 12

Round 13

Round 14

Round 15

Round 16

Round 17

Round 18

Round 19

Round 20

Round 21

Ladder

Finals

Semi-finals

Preliminary final

Grand Final

References

External links
Official WAFL website
Westar Rules Season 2000

West Australian Football League seasons
Westar Rules